Calothamnus oldfieldii is a plant in the myrtle family, Myrtaceae and is endemic to the south-west of Western Australia. It is a small, spreading shrub with needle-shaped leaves and clusters of red flowers with 5 petals and 5 stamen bundles. (In 2014 Craven, Edwards and Cowley proposed that the species be renamed Melaleuca augusti-oldfieldii.)

Description

The flowers are bright red and arranged in small groups and the stamens are arranged in 5 claw-like bundles.

Taxonomy and naming
Calothamnus oldfieldii was first formally described by Victorian Government Botanist Ferdinand von Mueller in 1862 in Volume 3, Part 21 of Fragmenta Phytographiae Australiae. The specific epithet (oldfieldii) honours Augustus Frederick Oldfield, an English botanist and plant collector.

Distribution and habitat
Calothamnus oldfieldii occurs in the Carnarvon, Geraldton Sandplains and Yalgoo biogeographic regions where it grows in sandy kwongan.

Conservation
Calothamnus oldfieldii is classified as "not threatened" by the Western Australian government department of parks and wildlife.

References

oldfieldii
Myrtales of Australia
Plants described in 1862
Endemic flora of Western Australia
Taxa named by Ferdinand von Mueller